Acanthosicyos is a genus of thorny shrubs of the botanical family Cucurbitaceae, subfamily Cucurbitoideae. The genus name derives from the Greek words "akantha" for thorn and "sykios" for cucumber or gourd.

Species
Endemic to the Namib Desert in Africa, this genus is represented by two known species including Acanthosicyos horridus, the nara melon, an important food plant in its native range. Both species are dioecious.

  

Both the Nara and the Gemsbok Cucumber are edible; however, eating unripe fruit is highly inadvisable due to the presence of chemicals which "burn" the throat and esophagus.  The bushmen of the Kalahari eat the Gemsbok Cucumber after it has been roasted in a fire for a couple of hours.  This cooking renders the "burning" chemicals harmless; even if the cooked pulp is still slightly bitter, the Bushman seem to relish eating them, sucking out the contents and either spitting out or chewing up the plentiful seeds.

References

Bihrmann's Caudiciforms: Acanthosicyos naudinianus

Cucurbitoideae
Cucurbitaceae genera
Flora of Africa
Dioecious plants